Camaz 89 is a football club in Guadeloupe, based in the town of Capesterre-Belle-Eau.

They play in Guadeloupe's second division, the Promotion d'Honneur Regionale.

Achievements
 none

External links
 Tour des clubs 2008–2009 – Gwadafoot 
 Club info – French Football Federation 

Football clubs in Guadeloupe